is a racing video game developed by Ambrella for the Nintendo DS. It was a launch title both in Japan and Europe. Dash was released in Japan on December 2, 2004; Europe on March 11, 2005; North America on March 13, 2005; and Australia on April 7, 2005. It was the first Pokémon game to be released for the Nintendo DS.

The player uses a stylus to control a Pikachu and race through checkpoints. After players have passed each of the number of checkpoints in order, the course is completed. Dash has multiplayer support, and can connect with 6 different devices.

Gameplay
Dash is a top-down perspective racing video game in which the player uses a stylus to control a Pikachu and race through checkpoints. After players have passed all the checkpoints in order, the course is completed. The stylus is used by moving the stylus in the direction the player wants Pikachu to run. Along with racing on the ground, there are races in the sky using balloons. There are many different terrains such as mazestone paths, forests, beaches, water, swamp, and lava pools. Throughout the courses are power ups which allow the player to run on different terrains without slowing down. Dash also features a training cup, which is given to players starting the game for the first time. After completing the training cup, the player has the chance to play in the Grand Prix Mode. There are five main cups to compete in GP mode. Dash also offers harder GP modes that can be unlocked, which put the player against a faster level of Pokémon. Each cup has five courses within its area.

Connectivity to other devices
Dash has multiplayer support. Up to six Nintendo DS units can be connected together. Dash features compatibility with the Game Boy Advance games Pokémon Ruby, Sapphire, FireRed, LeafGreen, or Emerald. If the player inserts any of those cartridges in Slot 2, and has completed GP mode, they can play courses shaped like the Pokémon in their team. The time to complete the courses depends on factors like type and level.

Development
Dash was developed for the Nintendo DS by Ambrella, who also developed Hey You, Pikachu! and Pokémon Channel. It was first revealed October 7, 2004, as a launch title for Japan. Dash was released in Japan on December 2, 2004; Europe on March 11, 2005; North America on March 13, 2005; and Australia on April 7, 2005. Before the North American release, The Pokémon Center had pre-order deals which included keychains and DS carrying pouches.

Reception

The game received generally negative reviews, having an aggregate score of 46/100 on Metacritic, and a score of 49 on GameRankings. IGN Craig Harris rated the game 5/10 because the player could only play as Pikachu in single player, and could also be finished within hours. GameSpot Alex Navarro rated the game 5.2/10, stating Dash "is simply one of the laziest uses of the DS's touch screen technology to date". GamePro Slo Mo rated the game 3.5/5 stating "Dash might not make much of a splash, but it should be a good kid-pleaser." GameSpy's Phil Theobald rated the game 2/5 stating "Gimmicky titles like this may be cute diversions, but they're no substitute for the real deal." Electronic Gaming Monthly gave the game 58/100, calling it a "cute and fun little racing game that has a great multiplayer component, but there's simply not enough to it." Nintendo Power rated the game 56/100, stating "Controlling Pikachu with stylus strokes is actually quite fun, but as a racing game, Dash isn't fully realized." Game Informer rated the game 55/100, calling it more of an exercise in anger management than a game. While discussing the mixed quality of Pokémon spin-offs, Retronauts cited Pokémon Dash as an example.

By December 23, Dash had sold 109,000 copies.

Notes

References

External links
 Pokémon Dash official website

2004 video games
Ambrella games
Nintendo DS games
Nintendo DS-only games
Multiplayer and single-player video games
Racing video games
Video games about mice and rats
Video games developed in Japan
Dash
Top-down video games